Valentina Giacinti (born 2 January 1994) is an Italian professional footballer who plays as forward for Serie A club A.S. Roma and the Italy women's national team.

Club career

P.C.A. Atalanta 
Giacinti begun career with the P.C.A. Atalanta youth team. She made her senior career debut on 30 January 2010 as a 65th minute substitute in a Serie A match against Graphistudio Tavagnacco. She made a total of ten appearances for the club in her debut season but did not score for the season. Atalanta was relegated to Serie A2 at the end of the season.

The following 2010–11 Seria A2 season would proved to be Giacinti's breakout season as she established herself as a starter for her team. She would begun her season with her first senior career goal on 26 September 2010 in a league match against Entella Chiavari, ending the match with a hat-trick. She would end the season with 15 goals in 21 appearances. The next season, she would scored another 19 goals in 25 appearances.

Napoli 
On 17 July 2012, Giacinti completed her move to Napoli. On 2 September 2012, she scored her first goal for the club in the Coppa Italia match against Caira. She would end the season with 19 goals in 34 appearances across all competition.

Mozzanica 
On 17 July 2013, Giacinti would transfer to Mozzanica.

Brescia 
In the summer of 2017, Giacinti would move to Brescia to pursue UEFA Women's Champions League football. While with Brescia, she won the Supercoppa Italiana for the first time and completed her season as the league's top scorer for the second time in her career, with 21 goals, and help her club reach the final play-off for the scudetto before losing to Juventus.

A.C. Milan 
On 11 June 2018, Brescia's Serie A license and their senior player contracts was bought over by A.C. Milan in order to start their own women's section. Giacinti's contract was then transferred to the newly formed A.C. Milan Femminile. She would continue her excellent scoring streak and ended as the league's top scorer again with 21 goals in 21 games played.

Following the departure of Daniela Sabatino in the 2019–20 season, Giacinti was made the new team captain for Milan. She suffered a cervical trauma during a home match against Tavagnacco. She was sidelined for a few days before the league was suspended due to the COVID-19 pandemic.

The following season, Giacinti would help A.C. Milan to qualify for the UEFA Women's Champions League for the first time in their history as they finished second in the league. They would also reached the final of the Coppa Italia, where they lost on penalties against Roma. She would end the season as the club's top scorer again with 24 goals in 29 appearances across all competition.

In her fourth season with the club, Giacinti would become the first player to cross the milestone of 50 goals in Serie A wearing the Rossoneri shirt. She was stripped of the captain armband in favor of Valentina Bergamaschi following some frictions with the technical staff. She would then depart the club during the winter transfer window.

Fiorentina (loan) 
During the 2022 January transfer window, Giacinti would completed her loan transfer to Fiorentina. Her first goal in the purple shirt came in a 2-2 draw against Juventus on 22 January 2022. She would suffer an injury on 20 March 2022 in a home match against Verona. She would return on the final day of the campaign where she scores a brace against Empoli and helped Fiorentina avoid relegation.

A.S. Roma 
On 21 July 2022, Giacinti completed her transfer to Roma. She made her debut for the club on 18 August 2022, during Roma debut in the UEFA Women's Champions League match against Glasgow City. Her first goal in the Giallorossi shirt came on 28 August 2022 in a 2-0 away win against Pomigliano. On 5 November 2022, she won the Supercoppa Italiana for the second time in her career after beating Juventus 4-3 on penalties. On 11 February 2023, she played her 250th match in Serie A during a league match against Inter Milan.

International career
Giacinti was named in the 23-player Italy squad for the 2019 FIFA Women's World Cup. Despite Giacinti's prolific record at club level, national team coach Milena Bertolini tended to deploy her as a substitute in the run up to the tournament. Giacinti scored Italy's opening goal in a 2–0 victory against China in the round of 16.

Career statistics

Club

International 

Scores and results list Italy's goal tally first, score column indicates score after each Giacinti goal.

Honours

Brescia

 Supercoppa Italiana: 2017–18

A.S Roma
 Supercoppa Italiana: 2022–23
Individual
AIC Best Women's XI: 2019

References

External links

 

1994 births
Living people
Italian women's footballers
Italy women's international footballers
Women's association football forwards
Fiorentina Women's F.C. players
A.C. Milan Women players
Serie A (women's football) players
A.C.F. Brescia Calcio Femminile players
Atalanta Mozzanica Calcio Femminile Dilettantistico players
2019 FIFA Women's World Cup players
Sportspeople from the Province of Bergamo
People from Trescore Balneario
Footballers from Lombardy
S.S.D. Napoli Femminile players
UEFA Women's Euro 2022 players
A.S. Roma (women) players
21st-century Italian women